A black sitcom is a sitcom that principally features black people in its cast. Prominent black sitcoms to date typically come from the United States with African American casts. Although sitcoms with primarily black characters have been present since the earliest days of network television, this genre rose to prominence in the 1990s.

History

Early twentieth century

In the early days of television, black actors were often cast in stereotypical roles, often as comic clowns in a tradition tracing back to the genre of black minstrelsy popular in the early 20th century. The first television sitcom to portray black people, Amos 'n' Andy, was widely popular among diverse audiences. The actors on the original radio show were both white, but the 1951-53 television show portrayed them with black actors, and represented black individuals as businesspeople, judges, lawyers and policemen. After over 70-odd episodes had been broadcast, it was taken off the air after protests from specific groups including the NAACP, who alleged that the show engaged in stereotyping. Afterwards, there were no all-black sitcoms shown in the U.S. until the 1970s.

1970s–1980s
A series of popular black sitcoms appeared in the 1970s, including Sanford and Son, Good Times, That's My Mama, The Jeffersons, and What's Happening!!. These sitcoms were widely popular amongst diverse audiences, while celebrating black culture. In the 1980s sitcoms such as The Cosby Show, A Different World, and Frank's Place, challenged stereotypical portrayals of black people and were well received.

1990s
After the 1980s, the major U.S. television networks appeared to lose interest in black sitcoms. In the 1990s, newer networks such as Fox, The WB and UPN, anxious to establish themselves with a black audience, featured black sitcoms such as Martin and Living Single, which drew high ratings among black households and were profitable even with a limited white viewership. 

Though there were some black sitcoms successful with white audiences in the 1990s such as Family Matters, Moesha, Sister, Sister and The Fresh Prince of Bel Air, the number of new programs continued to decline.  From 1997 to 2001, the number of black sitcoms on U.S. television declined from 15 to 6 as white viewership declined, and that decline has generally continued. Civil rights organizations have accused networks of denying minorities equal opportunity as well as a broader participation in general television programming.

2010s

By the early 2010s, black sitcoms had faded away on broadcast/network television (ABC, The CW, NBC, CBS, and FOX) but there were signs of a comeback on cable such as The Game, canceled in 2009 and then renewed on BET, A.N.T. Farm on Disney Channel, Are We There Yet?, Tyler Perry's For Better Or Worse on TBS, Love That Girl! on TV One, Let's Stay Together and Reed Between the Lines, on BET. Also, there have been a return of reruns of popular 1990s black sitcoms on BET, BET Her, Bounce TV, TV Land, TV One, MTV2, and TBS.

On August 10, 2012, Tyler Perry's House of Payne surpassed The Jeffersons and became the longest-running sitcom with a predominantly African-American cast in the history of American television in terms of number of episodes.

On August 23 and 24, 2012, Debbie Allen, the former chief creative force of A Different World from 1988 to 1993, wrote on Twitter that she wants to reboot A Different World. Over a million people on Facebook, Twitter, and blogs reacted to the tweet and approved the potential reboot.
On September 24, 2014, the ABC sitcom Black-ish premiered with over 11 million people watching the premiere episode. It was met with mostly positive reviews, garnering an 86% rating on Rotten Tomatoes. The show includes many references to current racial issues in America. Black-ish has two spin-off series, Mixed-ish and Grown-ish, which also have African-American leads and deal with racial issues.

Analysis
The favorite programs of television audiences tend to reflect their different ethnic origins and affinities. The exposure of the black community on U.S. TV has been greater than that of other minorities but continues to reflect racial divisions within American society.

After U.S. networks were criticized by the National Association for the Advancement of Colored People (NAACP) for a lack of racial diversity, drama shows, such as The West Wing, began casting more black characters. 

From the 1980s to early 2000s, Black sitcoms such as The Cosby Show, Family Matters, Living Single, Moesha, and One on One, showed an evolution of how the lives of African Americans were portrayed.

Black sitcoms feature highly in the black audience's top 10 programs but have limited success with white audiences, attributed by Doug Alligood, senior vice-president at the advertising agency BBDO which has analyzed ratings figures, to the failure of humor to translate. The high ratings achieved by The Cosby Show have been ascribed to humor that has appealed to both whites and blacks. Black households make up over 20 percent of regular TV viewers.

References 

 
American comedy
sitcom